The Toronto Transit Commission (TTC) uses buses and other vehicles for public transportation. , the TTC has 192 bus routes in operation, including 28 night bus routes.

Bus routes extend throughout the city and are integrated with the subway system and the streetcar system, with free transfers among the three systems. Many subway stations are equipped with bus terminals, and a few with streetcar terminals, located within a fare paid area.

, the bus system has about 2,100 buses. Bus propulsion includes diesel, diesel-electric hybrid, battery-electric and gasoline. All buses are fully accessible with low floors and, except for minibuses, all are equipped with bicycle racks.

History

19th and 20th centuries 
Bus service in Toronto began in 1849, when the first public transport system in Toronto, the Williams Omnibus Bus Line, was launched. The service began with a fleet of six horse-drawn stagecoaches. After ten years, the use of streetcars were introduced in the city as the Toronto Street Railway (TSR) was established in 1861. After a year of competition between the two companies, the TSR had surpassed Williams Omnibus Line in ridership.

Until 1921, several private and publicly owned transport systems were established and ended up being merged into one another or abandoned. Electric streetcars were widely used in Toronto and surrounding settlements during the new century. After the establishment of the Toronto Transportation Commission (TTC) (predecessor of the Toronto Transit Commission (also having the acronym of TTC) until 1954), streetcar routes were taken over from predecessors in 1921. It ran bus routes by using motor buses for the first time in the city. The TTC also experimented the use of trolley buses from 1922 to 1925, operating a line on Merton  and Mount Pleasant Road. Gray Coach, an intercity bus line by the TTC, began operation in 1927. As the coach service increased in ridership, the TTC built the Toronto Coach Terminal. By 1933, the TTC introduced the local bus and streetcar stop design, a white pole with a red band on the top and bottom. Between 1930 and 1948, the city replaced various TTC-operated radial railway routes extending to surrounding municipalities with bus routes.

On 1 January 1954, the TTC became the sole public transit operator in the newly formed Metropolitan Toronto. Thus, the TTC took over some private bus operations that existed within the Metro area. These included:
 Hollinger Bus Lines (1921–1954), operating in East York and Scarborough
 Danforth Bus Lines (1920–1954), operating in Scarborough and North York, with interurban services to Claremont and King City
 Roseland Bus Lines (1925–1954), operating in York Township, Etobicoke, Weston, and Woodbridge
 West York Bus Lines (1932–1954), operating in the west and northwest suburbs, including Malton

Between 1947 and 1993, the TTC operated a trolley bus system on medium ridership routes. In 1947, the TTC created four trolley bus routes (Lansdowne, Ossington, Annette, and Weston Road) in the west end that replaced streetcar routes. These routes were based at the Lansdowne garage. About 1954, a separate trolley bus division was created at the old Eglinton garage (adjacent to Eglinton station) to serve routes on Yonge Street, Avenue Road and Mount Pleasant Road north of Eglinton Avenue. When the Yonge–University subway was extended to York Mills station, the Yonge trolley bus line was closed and its buses were reassigned to serve Bay Street. In the early 1970s, the trolley bus fleet was rebuilt. The TTC leased some trolley buses from Edmonton, which was phasing out its fleet. The last trolley buses ran in 1993 on the Bay and Annette routes. Rather than replacing the aging trolley bus infrastructure, the TTC decided to use CNG buses to replace the trolley bus fleet.

In January 1960, the General Motors "New Look" buses, informally called "fishbowls", went into service. As earlier New Looks were retired they in turn would be replaced by newer versions of the New look model, with the result that the model would serve Toronto for over 50 years.

In 1966, plans were made to replace all streetcar routes with buses in the next 20 years. The plan was cancelled in 1972 and streetcar routes were rebuilt. In 1970, GO Transit was established by the Government of Ontario with Gray Coach serving as its operator for most of its routes. The TTC operated its first dial-a-bus services under GO Transit in 1973. In 1975, the first paratransit service, Wheel-Trans, was established by a private operator. The TTC also began using minibuses for minor routes, which would be replaced by regular buses by 1981.

In 1982, the TTC acquired 12 articulated buses, the articulated version of the GM New Look bus. The Province of Ontario sponsored the buses as a trial. The bus had rear-wheel drive whereby the trailer section pushes the rest of the bus. The TTC sold all 12 of these buses to Mississauga in 1987, and chose the Orion Ikarus articulated bus.

In 1987, the TTC acquired 90 Orion Ikarus articulated buses; Ikarus manufactured the components in Budapest, Hungary and Orion Bus Industries assembled them in its Mississauga plant. The buses had mid-section wheel drive whereby the front section of the bus pulled the trailer section. Poor welding led to corrosion problems, and the TTC retired 50 of the buses by 1999. The last Orion Ikarus bus ran in June 2003.

In 1987, the TTC implemented the Blue Night Network, an expansion of its overnight services using buses and streetcars. The following year, the TTC took over Wheel-Trans services. The TTC sold Gray Coach Lines to the Scotland-based Stagecoach Group in 1990, while also introducing "community buses", providing minibus service in a few residential neighbourhoods.

In 1989, the TTC began using buses fuelled by compressed natural gas (CNG). Supported by subsidies from senior governments, the TTC used CNG buses to replace its trolley bus fleet. CNG buses were serviced at the Wilson Yard which had a special CNG fueling station. Because of safety concerns about CNG fuel tanks on the bus roof and low overhead clearances, these buses were banned from interior terminals. Also, the savings of using natural gas over diesel fuel was not as great as expected. The TTC converted some CNG buses to diesel.

Accessibility expanded to regular buses in 1996 with the use of lift-equipped buses. This was further improvised two years later when low-floor buses were added to the fleet.

21st century 
Between 2006 and 2009, the TTC made its first purchases of hybrid electric buses, choosing the Orion VII model. These buses had batteries that would only last 18 months instead of the expected 5 years. As a result, the TTC went back to purchasing diesel buses until 2018, when it would try hybrid technology again.

In 2009, the TTC opened its first BRT route that uses its own dedicated busway and bus lanes when route 196 York University Rocket was rerouted to the York University Busway. The extension of Line 1 to Vaughan Metropolitan Centre opened in December 2017 caused the TTC to discontinue service on the 196, and since 2022, the 939B Finch Express is the only route that continues to use it.

In December 2011, the TTC bus fleet became fully accessible with the retirement of the last of the old, non-accessible GM "New Look" buses, a model dating back to the 1950s. The last New look buses ran on 52 Lawrence West on 16 December, and were replaced by accessible Orion VII low-floor buses. At that time, the TTC operated 1,800  accessible buses, all of which were equipped with bike racks.

The TTC ordered 27 articulated buses from Nova Bus, which began revenue operation in the spring of 2014.

As of 23 December 2016, all of the buses in the TTC system have Presto card readers. Buses delivered to the TTC since 2017 have a new livery based on the livery of the Flexity Outlook streetcars.

In November 2018, the TTC received the first 55 of 255 hybrid electric buses, specifically the LFS Hybrid model from Nova Bus.

In April 2019, the TTC received the first of 60 electric buses from the three bus manufacturers: Proterra, New Flyer, and BYD. On 3 June 2019, the first electric bus (from New Flyer) went into revenue service on the 35 Jane bus route. On 26 October 2019, Proterra Catalyst BE40 electric buses went into service on the 6 Bay bus route. By September 2020, the BYD K9M buses had arrived, and on 8 September, the first BYD bus went into service on the 116 Morningside route. At this point in time, with 60 electric buses, the TTC boasted it had the largest fleet of electric buses in North America.

In 2020, effects of the COVID-19 pandemic caused TTC ridership to decrease dramatically. On 23 March 2020, the TTC suspended all express bus services system-wide, with the exception of the 900 Airport Express and 927 Highway 27 Express. A number of seats began to be blocked off to encourage social distancing.

On 31 May 2021, the TTC started a pilot for free Wi-Fi on buses, starting with the 35 Jane route and to continue later in June with the 102 Markham Road route.

In late October 2021, the West Rouge automated shuttle trial was scheduled to start using an autonomous vehicle. The route was to have run from Rouge Hill GO Station to West Rouge Community Centre. During the trial, the vehicle would operate with an attendant. The project was jointly sponsored by the City of Toronto, Metrolinx and the TTC. However, the project was suspended after an accident involving the Whitby Autonomous Vehicle Electric shuttle operated by Durham Region Transit, which used the same type of vehicle. The project was cancelled after the vehicle supplier became defunct in mid-January 2022.

Operations

Routes 

The TTC operates four types of bus routes:
 Regular and limited service routes operating during the day and evening (route numbers 7–189)
 Express routes that serve only major bus stops (900-series routes)
 Blue Night routes that operates only at night (300-series routes)
 Community routes using minibuses connecting hubs within a community (400-series routes)

The TTC also offers its Wheel-Trans service for registered users with disabilities. This service operates door-to-door and requires booking in advance. Wheel-Trans uses minibuses and has no predefined routes.

Routes with regular service operate all day, every day from approximately 6 am (8 am Sundays) to 1 am. Routes with limited service are similar but do not operate during all periods of the day or not on all days of the week. Limited service varies by route.

Express bus service serves only select stops. The frequency of express service varies by route, and service on some routes does not operate during all periods of the day or all days of the week.

Blue Night Network routes operate from approximately 1:30 am until 6 am (8 am on Sundays) and have 30-minute or better service.

Community bus routes operate midday, Monday to Friday, connecting seniors' residences within a community with nearby hubs such as plazas, medical buildings and community centres. Community bus service uses the same mini-bus fleet as WheelTrans but has fixed routes and requires no booking. Customers flag down buses anywhere along the route.

Many regular bus routes are divided into branch routes, which deviate slightly from the original route or which terminate at different points along the route. A route can be referred to by its route number or name (for example, 189 Stockyards). Routes are named after the street or area served. All of the TTC's regular routes, except for 99 Arrow Road, 171 Mt. Dennis and 176 Mimico GO, connect to a subway station; 99 Arrow Road and 171 Mt. Dennis serve the areas around their respective bus garages. Vaughan Metropolitan Centre, and  stations do not have any connections to regular daytime TTC bus routes.

Some bus routes extend beyond the city limits into Mississauga (west of Pearson International Airport) and York Region (north of Steeles Avenue), as those municipalities contract out bus routes to the TTC outside of Toronto.  An extra fareequal to the cost of the MiWay or York Region Transit fare respectivelyis required for the service operating in those areas in addition to the regular TTC fare. Despite almost completely being in Mississauga, Pearson International Airport is within the TTC's fare-paid zone.

Priority bus lanes 

In 2020, as part of a municipal initiative dubbed RapidTO, the TTC started to set up priority bus lanes along several routes in Toronto. These are different from existing High Occupancy Vehicle (HOV) lanes in that they are in effect 24 hours per day seven days per week, and may only be used by buses and bicycles, with taxis and private vehicles not being allowed. The priority bus lanes are identified by paint and signage.

The COVID-19 pandemic provided the impetus for the RapidTO project. The lanes are to improve TTC service in lower-income neighbourhoods, which house employees performing essential services during the pandemic. By allowing buses to move faster, there would be less crowding and better physical distancing.

The lanes prevent road traffic from slowing bus service and disrupting the spacing between buses, which had resulted in gaps and bunching. The lanes are expected to improve efficiency so that fewer buses are required to produce the same level of service, with the extra buses being deployed to provide additional bus service.

Bus priority lanes are painted in red with diamond and "bus only" markings. Private vehicles may use some portions of the lanes, painted with red stripes, to access driveways or to make right turns. There are no physical barriers to separate bus from general traffic lanes. Motorists illegally using a bus priority lane are subject to a $110 fine and 3 demerit points.

The priority routes are:
 Eglinton Avenue East, Kingston Road and Morningside Avenue from Brimley Road (and eventually from Kennedy station) to the University of Toronto Scarborough
 Jane Street from Eglinton Avenue to Steeles Avenue
 Dufferin Street from Dufferin Gate to Wilson Avenue
 Steeles Avenue West from Yonge Street to Pioneer Village station
 Finch Avenue East from Yonge Street to McCowan Road
 Lawrence East from east of Victoria Park Avenue to Rouge Hills Drive near Rouge Hill GO Station

The TTC opened the Eglinton East lanes on 11 October 2020 (with the lanes on Morningside Avenue opening a few days earlier) and expects to implement the Jane lanes in the second quarter of 2021. The implementation dates for the other routes have yet to be announced.

Eglinton East 
The Eglinton East route runs  from Brimley Road and Eglinton Avenue to the University of Toronto Scarborough campus along Eglinton Avenue, Kingston Road and Morningside Avenue. The TTC converted the existing HOV lanes on Eglinton Avenue East and the curbside general-purpose lanes on Kingston Road and Morningside Avenue to priority bus-only lanes. Priority lanes will not be implemented between Kennedy station and Brimley Road until construction for the Scarborough Subway Extension is completed. Both local and express bus routes use the priority lanes, and the number of bus stops were reduced to speed up service. The TTC estimated a travel time savings of 16.5 percent on local services and 6.5 percent on express services. The implementation of priority bus lanes will not preclude a future upgrade to light rail. The Eglinton East lanes were expected to cost nearly $8million.

When implementing the corridor, the TTC reduced the number of stops along the way from 69 to 48, a net reduction of 21 stops, and was reviewing the "consolidation" of six additional stops. Some of the eliminated stops were far from a signalized intersection; some others had few nearby destinations. Having fewer stops allowed faster bus service but, for many riders, resulted in longer walk times to a bus stop. For example, when the stop near two apartment buildings at Dale Avenue and Kingston Road was eliminated, riders had to walk an extra . Riders, including those with disabilities, complained.

Five routes use the Eglinton priority bus lanes:
 12D Kingston Rd
 86 Scarborough
 116 Morningside
 905 Eglinton East Express
 986 Scarborough Express

Jane 
The Jane bus priority lanes will run along Jane Street between Eglinton Avenue and Steeles Avenue. These lanes were expected to open in 2021, but their setup has been delayed to allow for public consultation in 2023.

The Jane route is next in priority for implementation because:
 It has one of the slowest operating speeds in 2020.
 It provides a north–south connection with three subway lines, the existing Line 1 Yonge–University, and Line 5 Eglinton and Line 6 Finch West, both under construction.
 It serves many Neighbourhood Improvement Areas.
 There are no adverse impacts to on-street parking.

Automatic passenger counting 
Automatic passenger counting (APC) is a feature installed on TTC buses to automatically to keep a count of the passengers on board each bus. The feature uses infrared lights at doors to count passengers boarding and exiting buses. Along with bus location, APC data is transmitted to a central computer in real time and is used for service planning and transit control, as well as to deter fare evasion by some degree. Using APC data, the TTC can monitor passenger load on buses and optimize bus assignments on routes that have a potential for crowding. , all but 34 of the TTC's more than 2000 buses have ATC; none of the streetcars in the commission's fleet have the feature.

APC also supports the Transit iOS/iPadOS and Android app, allowing them to advise riders about bus crowding. This feature was introduced in April 2021 during the COVID-19 pandemic to support physical distancing. The TTC says it will continue to support these apps after the pandemic ends.

Emergencies
If there is a power failure affecting either the streetcar or subway system, the TTC will deploy shuttle buses. For this purpose, the TTC states it has adequate buses available for such emergencies.

The TTC relies on City of Toronto crews to clear roads of ice and snow during winter storms. However, the TTC may put certain vulnerable bus stops out of service to avoid buses getting stuck. This occurs for stops being historically problematic during winter storms. The TTC will post sign at such stops about one hour prior to the storm advising riders of the nearest alternative stop. The TTC also contracts with private tow truck operators to recover TTC buses trapped during winter storms.

Garages 
The following is a list of active TTC bus garages:

For major bus overhauls, the TTC uses the Duncan Shop (W.E.P. Duncan Building) and the D.W. Harvey Shops at the Hillcrest Complex.

, three garages have equipment to recharge electric buses: Arrow Road (for New Flyer buses), Mount Dennis (for Proterra buses) and Eglinton (for BYD buses).

, the TTC has been in negotiation with Toronto Hydro and Ontario Power Generation (OPG) to set up eBus infrastructure at TTC garages. Toronto Hydro would increase electrical capacity at each TTC garage, and OPG would design, build, operate and maintain all charging infrastructure at garages. The TTC hopes to get TTC board approval in the first quarter of 2021.

Former garages

Vehicles 

On 22 October 2020, the TTC board approved the following purchases for new buses:
 300 hybrid buses to start operating in 2022
 300 electric buses to start operating in 2023
 70 minibuses for Wheel-Trans service to start operating in 2022.

Diesel low-floor buses 

The TTC has a fleet of Orion VII low-floor buses built from 2006 to 2012, and the Nova LFS, built from 2015 to 2018.

The first order of 51 diesel low-floor diesel buses, of the D40LF model, were manufactured by New Flyer in 1999 and retired in 2016. 220 Orion VIIs, manufactured by Orion Bus Industries, were added to the roster in 2003 and 2004, with the another 250 acquired in 2005. Between 2012 and 2014, the fleet was rebuilt; it took approximately eight days to complete a rebuild and cost about $175,000. Further deliveries were added between 2006 and 2007 with 180 buses acquired with the UWE heating system removed, and an additional 217 buses between 2010 and 2012 were delivered as diesel buses instead of hybrids. 12 buses from the 2007 Orion order were retrofitted with luggage racks at a cost of $2,000 per bus, which replaced some of the single seats, had new airport-themed livery installed, and are dedicated to the 900 Airport Express service to Toronto Pearson International Airport from Kipling station.

After the success of the articulated buses, the TTC purchased over 213  LFS diesel buses between 2015 and 2016. An additional 382 buses were added to the order in 2017 and 2018 to replace the retiring Orion VII buses manufactured between 2002 and 2005 due to emissions problems, while another 270 were added in 2018 and came equipped with external security cameras and USB ports where customers could charge their mobile devices on the bus.

Articulated buses 

Introduced in 2013, the Nova Bus articulated buses are the third generation of articulated buses in Toronto, the earlier two being those manufactured by General Motors (operating from 1982 to 1987) and by Orion-Ikarus (operating from 1987 to 2003). The total cost of the Nova articulated fleet was $143.7million. Fewer operators are required as the 18-metre articulated bus (carrying 46 seated and approximately 31 standing passengers) has 45 percent more passenger capacity than a 12-metre bus. Each bus can accommodate two standard wheelchairs and provides nine priority passenger seats. Each bus features three doors, LED interior and exterior lighting and automatic central air conditioning and heating. The "clean diesel" engines minimize engine exhaust emissions using electronic engine controls and treatment systems for diesel exhaust.

In late April 2017, the TTC temporarily withdrew the entire Nova articulated fleet from service because one of the buses experienced a "full throttle", that is, an unexpected acceleration. Nova provided a software fix that required 20 minutes per bus to install allowing buses to go back into service.

Hybrid-electric buses 

The TTC has two models of hybrid-electric buses (also called diesel-electric buses), Orion VII built from 2006 to 2009, and the LFS Hybrid built in 2018 and 2019.

The Orion VII hybrid buses, like its diesel counterparts, have features such as air-conditioning, GPS for automatic stop announcements, a wheelchair ramp and the ability to kneel at the front door for easier boarding. Fuel savings of 10 to 30 percent were expected compared to diesel buses. However, the model achieved only 10 percent savings because it was designed to work best in stop-and-go traffic which occurs mainly in downtown Toronto. The batteries were problematic requiring replacement every 18 months when they were expected to last five years. At $700,000 per bus, the hybrid was $200,000 more expensive than a diesel-only bus.

The LFS Hybrid is essentially an electric bus with an onboard diesel generator to produce electricity to recharge an onboard battery as needed. Unlike for electric buses, the battery is not recharged overnight. These diesel-electric buses use 25 percent less fuel than a diesel bus. Also, energy produced by descending a hill or braking will help recharge the battery. The bus is driven by an electric motor with electricity drawn from the on-board battery. On-board systems such as doors, HVAC, power steering, etc. are electrically powered.

Electric buses 

The TTC has a goal to operate an emissions-free bus fleet by 2040. In 2018, the TTC received three demonstrator electric buses for evaluation to test the performance of electric vehicles. The TTC received one bus each from manufacturers: California-based Proterra, Winnipeg-based New Flyer (part of NFI Group) and Chinese-based BYD.

In April 2019, the TTC received the first of 60 electric buses after ordering 25 each from Proterra and New Flyer, and 10 from BYD. The 60 buses, plus infrastructure changes at three TTC garages, costed approximately $140million with the federal government paying $65million of that cost.

The buses are powered exclusively by lithium-ion batteries that take about three hours to recharge. The electric buses are 15 to 20 percent quieter in motion, and 85 percent quieter when idling. These buses, with a 440,000-watt onboard battery, can be used as mobile power plants during power outages, by plugging the bus into a building such as a hospital.

BYD buses require different recharging infrastructure than Proterra and New Flyer buses, with the former using AC (alternating current) and the latter two using DC (direct current). The Eglinton garage has AC recharging, while Arrow Road and Mount Dennis garages have DC.

Shelters 

Prior to the 1980s, the bus shelters on TTC routes were installed and maintained by the TTC and the various municipalities of Metropolitan Toronto and lacked advertising. Within the old city of Toronto, they were metal frames with large glass panes, but the suburban ones were metal-clad with fibreglass and smaller glass windows. A few older shelters, like Otter Loop (Small Arms and Coxwell Loops were similar for use on streetcar routes), were formal brick-and-glass structures; most of these disappeared in 1960s or 1970s, with Otter's structure surviving into the early 2000s. However, during the mid-2010s, the Otter Loop bus shelter was removed and the area was converted into Heart Park.

Shelters and related advertising displays had been installed by Trans Ad and later by Outfront Media (formerly CBS Outdoor, Mediacom and TDI). Outfront Media and Astral Media (a division of Bell Canada) are responsible for all other forms of non-electronic advertising on the TTC (excluding posters and digital advertising in the Toronto subway system and on buses and streetcars, which are managed by Pattison Outdoor Advertising, which includes OneStop Media for digital billboards).

Bike racks 

All TTC buses, except Wheel-Trans vehicles, are equipped with folding bike racks installed on the front of the bus. Depending on the bus model,the rack can hold either one or two bicycles. Cyclists must remove all loose or detachable accessories from bicycles stored on the rack. If all the rack slots are full, bicycles may be stored inside buses except during rush hours.

Background 
In mid-2005, the TTC began a pilot project to test bicycle racks on six selected routes as a way to boost ridership and to be more environmentally friendly.

In July 2007, the Commission authorized the addition of bike racks to the remainder of the TTC bus fleet except for buses to be retired over the following three years. The 2007 expenditure for installation was an unbudgeted $250,000, to be covered by a shortfall in 2007 capital expenditures. The Commission included another $1,720,000 in the 2008–2012 capital budget to install bike racks on remaining buses. All new buses ordered would be delivered either with bike racks installed or at least mounting brackets for TTC staff to install the racks. In December 2011, bike racks were available on all TTC buses except minibuses.

The Nova Bus LFS articulated buses came factory-equipped with bike racks, as did the non-articulated LFS buses that entered service in 2015. The racks were sealed in October 2014, by order of the Ministry of Labour, because of concerns about bikes on the racks obscuring the drivers' view. In May 2015, the slot closer to the bus was authorised for use. The other is sealed off with metal panels, and the retention hooks have been removed. Once the first slot is full, cyclists may bring their bikes inside the articulated bus during off-peak hours at the driver's discretion.

See also 
 GM New Look (Toronto Transit Commission bus)

References

External links 
 Transit Toronto Bus Pages
  published by the Toronto Star on 6 October 2020

Toronto Transit Commission